Anambra United Football Club was a Nigerian football club based in the city of Onitsha. They originally played games in Abakaliki from 1999–2008 as Ebonyi Angels FC, but the team was sold to Anambra State in March 2008 and were renamed Anambra United.

After relegation from the Nigeria National League in 2010, the team sold its slot in the Nigeria Amateur League to Westside F.C. and went on hiatus.

Final squad

External links
Official website
Anambra United recalls Coach Haruna
https://web.archive.org/web/20090217125150/http://completesportsnigeria.com/details.php?category=news

Anambra united may go up for sale
Fencing Of Ikpeazu Memorial Stadium Begins

Football clubs in Anambra State
1999 establishments in Nigeria
Sports clubs in Nigeria
Association football clubs established in 1999
Defunct football clubs in Nigeria